An international incident (or diplomatic incident) is a seemingly relatively small or limited action, incident or clash that results in a wider dispute between two or more nation-states. International incidents can arise from unanticipated actions involving citizens, government officials, or armed units of one or more nation-states, or out of a deliberate but small provocative action by espionage agents of one nation-state, or by terrorists, against another nation-state.

An international incident usually arises during a time of relative peace between nation-states, and in general is, on the surface, an unexpected event. Conflicts that grow out of a series of escalating skirmishes between nation-states generally are not considered international incidents; however, terrorist actions can and often do become international incidents. However, historical views of past international incidents often reveal the incident was the flashpoint of a simmering conflict between nation-states, or organizations opposing nation-states.

Wars have often been provoked by international incidents, and diplomatic efforts to prevent international incidents from growing into full-scale armed conflicts often have been unsuccessful. In the aftermath of the First World War, the League of Nations was established to help nations who were parties to an international incident achieve a solution to the incident through diplomatic means. Initially, the League of Nations had some success in working to find diplomatic solutions, however the failure of the League of Nations to prevent World War II resulted in the disbandment of the League of Nations in favor of the United Nations. As with its predecessor, the United Nations provides a means by which nations involved in an international incident can work to resolve the matter diplomatically rather than through the use of force.

The term is also applied to various incidents that can disrupt international commerce, and to celebrities or other well-known people who commit gaffes or otherwise act inappropriately, causing the press and sometimes governments to criticize their actions.

The International Court of Justice keeps a list of legal disputes between nation-states, many of which result from international incidents. The Royal Mail of the United Kingdom keeps a list on its website of current international incidents that might disrupt mail service. The incidents listed may or may not conform to the definitions given above.

Examples of international incidents

18th century

Battle of Jumonville Glen (1754)
Hanging of Joshua Huddy (1782)
XYZ affair (1797-1798)

19th century

Caroline Affair, which had a great effect on the development of international law (1837-1842)
Trent affair (1861)
María Luz Incident (1872)
Fashoda Incident, encounter of British and French forces whilst the countries vied for imperial influence in Africa (1898)

20th century
Dogger Bank incident - Russian ships mistook a British trawler fleet with the Japanese Fleet (1904) 
Assassination of Archduke Franz Ferdinand - Set off the First World War (1914)
Tampico Affair (1914)
Sinking of the RMS Lusitania - Moved the USA closer to WW1 involvement (1917)
Zimmermann Telegram - Proposed alliance between Germany and Mexico in WW1 (1917)
Bodyline Ashes (1932-33)
USS Panay incident (1937)
Tientsin incident (1939)
Gleiwitz incident - False-flag attack by Germany on itself, justifying World War 2 invasion (1939)
Zoot Suit Riots - Naval pogrom against Mexican-Americans that resulted in a formal complaint from the Mexican government (1943)
Amethyst Incident (1949)
Lavon Affair (1954)
Hungarian Revolution of 1956
Parking violations at a Filipino diplomatic mission (1959)
U-2 Crisis of 1960
Erection of Berlin Wall (1961)
Gulf of Tonkin Incident (1964)
USS Liberty incident (1967)
USS Pueblo incident (1968)
Dagmar Hagelin (1977)
Iran Hostage Crisis (1979-1981)
Yinhe incident (1993)
Korean Air Flight 007 (1983)
The sinking of the Rainbow Warrior (1985)
1986 West Berlin discotheque bombing
USS Stark incident (1987)
Shooting-down of Iran Air Flight 655 in 1988
Pan Am Flight 103 (1988)
Cavalese cable car disaster (1998)
United States bombing of the Chinese embassy in Belgrade (1999)
Elián González (1999)

21st century

Ehime Maru and USS Greeneville collision (2001)
9/11 (2001)
Hainan Island incident (2001)
 The May 2006 execution in Texas of Mexican national Jesús Ledesma Aguilar
 The poisoning of Alexander Litvinenko in London (2006)
2007 Iranian seizure of Royal Navy personnel
¿Por qué no te callas?, response given by King Juan Carlos I of Spain to Hugo Chávez, president of Venezuela, at the 2007 Ibero-American Summit (Santiago, Chile)
ROKS Cheonan sinking (2010)
Gaza flotilla raid (2010)
2010 Israel–Lebanon border clash
Shelling of Yeonpyeong (2010)
2011 NATO attack in Pakistan (2011)
2012 Italian shooting of unarmed Indian fishermen in the Arabian sea
Scarborough Shoal standoff (2012)
Retention of the Argentinian frigate Libertad in Ghana (2012)
Devyani Khobragade incident (2013)
2013 Lahad Datu standoff
The shootdown of Malaysia Airlines Flight 17 (2014)
Lu Yan Yuan Yu 010 (2016)
Poisoning of Sergei and Yulia Skripal (2018)
Killing of Jamal Khashoggi (2018)
Kerch Strait incident (2018)
Carlos Ghosn securities scandal (2018)
2019 El Paso shooting
2019 Bolivian political crisis
2020 Baghdad International Airport airstrike
Ukraine International Airlines Flight 752 (2020)
2021 Suez Canal obstruction
Ryanair Flight 4978 and the arrest of Roman Protasevich (2021)
AUKUS (2021)
Novak Djokovic COVID-19 scandal (2022)
2023 Chinese balloon incident
2023 Black Sea drone incident

See also
 Diplomacy
 Espionage
 War
 Terrorism

References

External links
 List of cases brought before the International Court of Justice since 1946
 Royal Mail International Incident list